Taeniotes naevius is a species of beetle in the family Cerambycidae. It was described by Henry Walter Bates in 1872. It is known from Ecuador, Colombia, and Peru.

References

naevius
Beetles described in 1872